Tai Fu Tai Mansion is a residence located in Wing Ping Tsuen, San Tin near Lok Ma Chau, north of Yuen Long, Hong Kong.

History
It was probably built in 1865 in the reign of the Qing Dynasty. It was built as a residence by Man Chung-luen whose ancestors had settled in San Tin since the 15th century.

In 2007, 3D laser scanning technology was used to digitally capture 3D images of the structure.

Description
The building is richly embellished with spacious grounds; a large open space in front and a garden at the back. The whole mansion is surrounded by a green-brick wall. It is a fine example of traditional Chinese dwellings of the scholar-gentry class.

References

External links

 Antiquities and Monuments Office
 Antiquities and Monuments Office. Pamphlet about Tai Fu Tai Mansion

Declared monuments of Hong Kong
San Tin
Houses completed in 1865
Houses in Hong Kong
Classical Lingnan-style buildings